Bentley Little (born 1960 in Mesa, Arizona) is an American author of horror fiction. Publishing an average of a novel a year since 1990, Little avoids publicity and rarely does promotional work or interviews for his writing.

Early life
Little is an Arizona native who, according to his professional biography, was born one month after his mother saw the world premiere of Alfred Hitchcock's film Psycho. He studied at California State University Fullerton, from which he earned a BA in Communications and an MA in Comparative Literature. His thesis for the latter was his first novel, The Revelation, which was later published and won a Bram Stoker Award.

Style and recognition
Little's novels tend to have brief titles (many use the construction "The [noun]", like The Mailman and The House) and fall squarely into the horror genre. He dislikes his work being categorized as "suspense" or "supernatural thriller", preferring the more straightforward genre label. His work has been championed by Stephen King and Dean Koontz, leading to increased recognition.

Adaptations
In 2007 Little's short story "The Washingtonians" was adapted for the TV show Masters of Horror, becoming the twelfth episode of its second season. Directed by Peter Medak, it significantly lightened the tone of the author's original work, aiming for camp over the short story's dark humour. It was negatively received by critics.

That same year The Hollywood Reporter announced that a film adaptation of the novel The Store was in development at Strike Entertainment, with a script by Jenna McGrath, production duties handled by Marc Abraham and Eric Newman, and executive production by Vince Gerardis, Eli Kirschner, and Tom Bliss. As of 2020 the project has not yet come to fruition.

On November 18, 2021, it was revealed that a TV series based on Little's novel The Consultant has been ordered by Amazon Prime Video.

Bibliography

Novels
 The Revelation (1990)
The Mailman (1991)
Death Instinct (1992) (writing as Phillip Emmons), also known as Evil Deeds
The Summoning (1993)
The Night School (1994) – released as University in 1995
Dominion (1996)
The Ignored (1997)
Guests (1997) – released in the U.S as The Town in 2000
The Store (1998)
The House (1999)
The Walking (2000)
The Town (2000) – updated re-release of Guests
The Association (2001)
The Return (2002)
The Policy (2003)
The Resort (2004)
Dispatch (2005)
The Burning (2006)
The Vanishing (2007)
The Academy (2008)
His Father's Son (2009)
The Disappearance (2010)
The Haunted (2012)
The Circle (2012)
The Influence (2013)
The Consultant (2016)
The Handyman (2017)
The Bank (2020)
Gloria (2021)

Collections
Murmurous Haunts (1997)
The Collection (2002)
Four Dark Nights (2002) (with Douglas Clegg, Christopher Golden, and Tom Piccirilli)
Indignities of the Flesh (2012)
Walking Alone: Short Stories (2018)

Short stories
Witch Woman (1985)
The Show (1987)
Looney Tunes (1987)
The Janitor (1988)
The Sanctuary (1989)
Miles to Go Before I Sleep (1991)
The Potato (1991)
The Washingtonians (1992)
The Man in the Passenger Seat (1993)
Monteith (1993)
From the Mouths of Babes (1994)
The Numbers Game (1994)
The Pond (1994)
See Marilyn Monroe's Panties! (1995)
Life With Father (1998)
Connie (1999)
The Theatre (1999)
After the Date (2005)
Pop Star in The Ugly Bar (2005)
Brushing (2007)
The Miracle (2012)

Awards
1990 Bram Stoker Award winner for Best First Novel (The Revelation)
1993 Bram Stoker Award nominee for Best Novel (The Summoning)
2012 Bram Stoker Award nominee for Best Novel (The Haunted)

References

External links

 

1960 births
Living people
20th-century American male writers
20th-century American novelists
20th-century American short story writers
21st-century American male writers
21st-century American novelists
21st-century American short story writers
American horror writers
American horror novelists
American male novelists
American male short story writers
Novelists from Arizona
Writers from Mesa, Arizona